The Amateur Baseball Association of Thailand (ABAT) is the national governing body for amateur baseball in Thailand.

Thai
Sports governing bodies in Thailand
Baseball in Thailand